Birnam Arts is a multipurpose arts centre in Birnam, Perthshire, central Scotland. It is also known as the Birnam Arts and Conference Centre, and was originally named the Birnam Institute.  It is a not for profit organisation owned by the community.

History
The Birnam Arts and Conference Centre was developed from 1880, to the plans of John Kinnaird, the village stationmaster, to build a facility for the community. This was the original Birnam Institute which was built and was opened on 29 September 1883.  It comprised a library, reading room, hall, a refreshment and games room, and accommodation for the caretaker. In 1890, public baths were added to the facilities that the Institute offered. During both World Wars, the Institute was used by the military for accommodation and entertainment purposes. By the 1990s the Institute no longer met the regulations for a public building, so a plan to redevelop it was created.  A major fundraising exercise allowed the building to be renovated and extended.  The work was completed in June 2001.

Today

 170-seat auditorium 
 Dance and drama workshop
 Meeting rooms
 Beatrix Potter exhibition and shop
 Foyer Café
 Public Library
 Art Exhibitions
 Community Learning offices

References

External links 
 Birnam Arts
 Birnam Library

Biographical museums in Scotland
Theatres in Scotland
Cinemas in Scotland
Public libraries in Scotland
Beatrix Potter
1883 establishments in Scotland
Museums in Perth and Kinross
Arts centres in Scotland